Hainsworth is a surname. Notable people with the surname include:

George Hainsworth (1893–1950), Canadian ice hockey player
Herb Hainsworth (1881–1955), Australian rules footballer 
Michael Hainsworth, Canadian business reporter
Sarah Hainsworth (born 1967), British university administrator